The 2016 Women's U23 Pan-American Volleyball Cup was the third edition of the bi-annual volleyball tournament. It was held in Miraflores and San Vicente de Cañete, Peru from 19 to 25 September among six countries. The Dominican Republic won the tournament for third time and qualified for the 2017 FIVB U23 World Championship along with silver medalists Argentina and Cuba, winners of the bronze medal. Dominican Republic player Brayelin Martínez won the Most Valuable Player award.

Competing nations

Preliminary round
All times are in Peru Time (UTC−05:00)

Round robin

Final round

Championship bracket

Semifinals

Fifth place match

Bronze medal match

Final

Final standing

Jineiry Martínez,
Winifer Fernández (L),
Gaila González,
Pamela Jorge,
Natalia Martínez,
Angelica Hinojosa,
Geraldine González,
Madeline Guillén,
Yokaty Pérez,
Vielka Peralta,
Larysmer Martínez,
Camila de la Rosa,
Lisbeth Rosario,
Brayelin Martínez

Individual awards

Most Valuable Player

Best Scorer

Best Spiker

Best Middle Blocker

Best Setter

Best Opposite

Best Libero

Best Digger

Best Receiver

Best Server

References

Women's Pan-American Volleyball Cup
Women's U23 Pan-American Volleyball Cup
Women's U23 Pan-American Volleyball Cup
2016 Women's U23 Pan-American Volleyball Cup